Giovanni Borsotti (born 18 December 1990) is an Italian alpine ski racer who competes for Centro Sportivo Carabinieri and represents Italy internationally.

Career
He made his FIS Alpine Ski World Cup debut in 2009.

He competed at the FIS Alpine World Ski Championships 2011 in Garmisch-Partenkirchen, where he placed 28 in giant slalom. He competed at the 2015 World Championships in Beaver Creek, USA, where he placed 24th in the giant slalom.

References

External links

News Sci Alpino

1990 births
Italian male alpine skiers
Living people
Place of birth missing (living people)
Alpine skiers of Centro Sportivo Carabinieri
21st-century Italian people